Janirellidae is a family of crustaceans belonging to the order Isopoda.

Genera:
 Dactylostylis Richardson, 1911
 Janirella Bonnier, 1896
 Triaina Just, 2009

References

Isopoda